Grevillea sulcata is a species of flowering plant in the family Proteaceae and is endemic to a restricted area in the south of Western Australia. It is a robust, spreading shrub with linear leaves and erect clusters of up to 14 scarlet flowers with an orange pollen presenter.

Description
The edges of the leaves are rolled under, concealing the lower surface apart from the mid-rib.

Taxonomy
Grevillea sulcata was first formally described in 1994 in The Grevillea Book from an unpublished description by Charles Gardner of specimens he collected at Cocanarup, near Ravensthorpe in 1924. The specific epithet (sulcata) means "furrowed", referring to the leaves.

Distribution and habitat

Conservation status
Grevillea sulcata is listed as "Priority One" by the Government of Western Australia Department of Biodiversity, Conservation and Attractions, meaning that it is known from only one or a few locations which are potentially at risk.

See also
 List of Grevillea species

References

sulcata
Proteales of Australia
Eudicots of Western Australia
Plants described in 1994